was a Japanese samurai of the late Edo period who went on to become a soldier, government official, and businessman in the Meiji era. He served as a karō in the Yonezawa Domain's administration.

Biography 
Takamasa was born in 1841 to a prominent samurai family in Akita Prefecture of the Yonezawa Domain. He was the firs son of Takaaki Chisaka, who was the chief retainer of the Yonezawa clan.

Government service 
Takamasa entered official service in 1863 and five years later, in 1863, he was given command of the han military force. He was promoted as a dai-sanji (chief councilor) in 1870 and later accompanied the clan lord Shigenori Uesugi on his European tour. When he returned to Japan in 1875, he served in the government's Home Ministry. It is noted that his position in the ministry was not secure due to his Yonezawa roots. The installation of representatives of the central governments from among those who came from the abolished domains was not universally welcomed in the ministry. 

In 1876 Takamasa would be called upon to put down the rebellion in the Ibaraki prefecture, and later in 1877, during the Satsuma Rebellion, he was appointed a first lieutenant in the army.

Private sector 
After his retirement from government service, Takamasa joined the private sector, holding executive positions at companies such as the Ryou Ginko (Ryou Bank), Ujigawa Hydroelectric Power Station, and Yokohama Soko (Yokohama Warehouse).

Takamasa's career demonstrated the transition of the lives of the samurai from service to their lords to civil or government service in modern Japan. This development was also indicative of the relationships between the samurai and their previous lords. In the case of Takamasa, his former liege promoted his employment – as was done for other former samurai (shizoku jusan) of the Kanazawa – by getting his appointment as Nomi County Chief approved. He was later appointed as the governor of Ishikawa Prefecture.

Takamasa was the father of Captain Tomojiro Chisaka, the Commander of the Yakumo, and Major Yojiro Chisaka, who served in the Imperial Army. He died on December 3, 1912 due to pleurisy and inflammation of the lungs.

References

External Links 
 Chisaka, Takamasa | Portraits of Modern Japanese Historical Figures at www.ndl.go.jp
 æPRãÄòËåEÝ ãÎö at www8.ocn.ne.jp

Japanese expatriates in the United Kingdom
Japanese military personnel
Samurai
Karō
1841 births
1912 deaths
People of the Boshin War
Meiji Restoration
Kazoku
Members of the House of Peers (Japan)
Uesugi retainers